Alexander DiGuido (born June 27, 1956) is an innovator in the direct response industry and in e-mail marketing methods. As of December, 2011, he is the former CEO of direct marketing company Zeta Interactive. Prior to his position with Zeta, DiGuido was the CEO of Epsilon Interactive, another direct marketing company, DiGuido also served as CEO of Bigfoot Interactive, CEO of Expression Engines, EVP at Ziff Davis, and publisher of Computer Shopper, where he launched ComputerShopper.com, a direct-to-consumer e-commerce engine. Prior to Ziff Davis, he was VP/advertising director for Sports Inc. DiGuido also serves on the Direct Marketing Association's Ethics Policy Committee.

Career
Al DiGuido was Chief Executive Officer of Zeta Interactive Corporation from October 2007 to December 2011. He received a bachelor's degree in political science from St. Francis College in Brooklyn, New York

DiGuido makes frequent appearances on Fox Business Channel and has been interviewed as well as contributes to major news outlets on the topic of the digital marketing industry and new technology.

Charity foundation
DiGuido is also founder and president of Al's Angels, an organization whose primary mission is to actively support existing charitable programs that provide assistance to children and families suffering hardships relating to life-threatening illnesses or conditions, such as Tomorrow’s Children's Fund, Saint Barnabas, Union Community Health, Norwalk Hospital, SCO Family Services, CLASP Homes, and New York Presbyterian Hospital.

References

External links 
 Zeta Interactive Corporation

Living people
American marketing people
1956 births
Place of birth missing (living people)
St. Francis College alumni